Joseph Fasano (born 1982) is an American poet and novelist. Fasano was raised in Goshen, New York, where he attended Goshen Central High School. He earned a BA in philosophy from Harvard University in 2005 and an MFA from Columbia University in 2008. His poem "Mahler in New York" won the 2008 RATTLE Poetry Prize. He has been a finalist for the Missouri Review Editors' Prize and the Times Literary Supplement Poetry Competition, among other honors. He has taught at SUNY Purchase, Manhattanville College, and Columbia University.

Fasano's poems have appeared in the Yale Review, the Southern Review, FIELD, Tin House, Boston Review, Measure, Passages North, the American Literary Review, and other publications.

In 2011, Fasano's first book, Fugue for Other Hands, won the Cider Press Review Book Award. It was nominated for the Kate Tufts Poetry Award and the Poets' Prize, "awarded annually for the best book of verse published by a living American poet two years prior to the award."  His second collection of poems, Inheritance, was released in May 2014. In 2015, Fasano published Vincent, a book-length poem based very loosely on the 2008 killing of Tim McLean by Vince Li on a Greyhound Bus near Portage la Prairie, Manitoba, on the Trans Canada Highway. His fourth collection of poems, The Crossing, was released in 2018.

Fasano's first novel, The Dark Heart of Every Wild Thing, was published in 2020 to critical acclaim.
His second novel, The Swallows of Lunetto, became a viral social media sensation during his 2023 European book tour, covered by the BBC, the Evening Standard, The Independent, and other media. 

In 2013, the literary magazine Polutona released a selection of his poems in Russian translation.

Bibliography
The Swallows of Lunetto (Maudlin House, 2022)
The Dark Heart of Every Wild Thing, (Platypus Press, 2020)
The Crossing (Cider Press Review, 2018)
Vincent (Cider Press Review, 2015)
Inheritance (Cider Press Review, 2014)
Fugue for Other Hands (Cider Press Review, 2013)

References 

American male poets
Living people
1982 births
Poets from New York (state)
People from Suffern, New York
People from Goshen, New York
Harvard College alumni
Manhattanville College faculty
Columbia University School of the Arts alumni
Columbia University faculty
21st-century American poets
21st-century American male writers